The Tonnage Tour was a worldwide concert tour by American rock band ZZ Top in support of their 2016 live album Live! Greatest Hits from Around the World.  The tour consisted of six legs that alternated between indoor and outdoor shows in the US, along with arenas and festivals in Europe. Much like their recent tours, the Tonnage Tour featured a stripped-down, intimate stage design. The band played a mixture of older and newer material during their set, which included songs from their latest studio album La Futura (2012).

Kevin Kinder from the Fayetteville Flyer thought the concert was "a highly choreographed concert, both subtly in the way Gibbons and bassist Dusty Hill swayed in unison during several moments, and more overtly in the way the show was paced."  The last eighteen dates in 2017 were cancelled to due Dusty Hill having an ailment. 

After 90 concerts in 2017, the Tonnage Tour grossed US$11.2 million, making it one of the top 200 grossing tours of the year. For the first two legs alone, the tour grossed $6.3 million with 166,943 tickets sold. After the fourth leg in the US, the tour's schedule was expanded to feature a co-headlining leg with John Fogerty, which was branded as "Blues & Bayous", and grossed $9 million with 359,553 tickets sold. At its conclusion, the Tonnage Tour had sold 1,083,675 tickets – with 154 shows – for a total gross of $26.2 million.

Personnel
Billy Gibbons - Guitar, Vocals
Dusty Hill - Bass, Vocals
Frank Beard - Drums, Percussion

Setlist
setlist from the Salt Lake City, Utah concert

1. Got Me Under Pressure
2. Waitin' For The Bus
3. Jesus Just Left Chicago
4. Gimme All Your Lovin'
5. Pincushion
6. I'm Bad, I'm Nationwide
7. I Gotsta Get Paid
8. Foxy Lady (The Jimi Hendrix Experience cover)
9. My Head's in Mississippi
10. Catfish Blues (Robert Petway cover)
11. Sixteen Tons (Tennessee Ernie Ford cover)
12. Act Naturally (Buck Owens cover)*featuring Francis Elwood
13. Just Got Paid
14. Sharp Dressed Man
15. Legs
encore
16. La Grange/BBQ/Sloppy Drunk Jam
17. Tush
second encore
18. Jailhouse Rock (Elvis Presley cover)

Tour dates

References

ZZ Top concert tours
2017 concert tours